Andrés Molina (10 November 1944 – 12 November 2003) was a Cuban boxer. He competed at the 1968 Summer Olympics and the 1972 Summer Olympics. At the 1968 Summer Olympics, he lost to Manfred Wolke of East Germany. At the 1972 Summer Olympics, he defeated Pentti Saarman and Anatoliy Kamnev, before losing to Ray Seales.

References

1944 births
2003 deaths
Cuban male boxers
Olympic boxers of Cuba
Boxers at the 1968 Summer Olympics
Boxers at the 1972 Summer Olympics
Pan American Games gold medalists for Cuba
Pan American Games medalists in boxing
Boxers at the 1967 Pan American Games
People from Villa Clara Province
Welterweight boxers
Medalists at the 1967 Pan American Games
20th-century Cuban people